Kyshka is a rural locality (a village) in Kochyovskoye Rural Settlement, Kochyovsky District, Perm Krai, Russia. The population was 194 as of 2010. There are 4 streets.

Geography 
Kyshka is located 6 km east of Kochyovo (the district's administrative centre) by road. Palkoyag is the nearest rural locality.

References 

Rural localities in Kochyovsky District